Bryceland may refer to:

Bryceland, Louisiana, a town in the United States
Tommy Bryceland (1939–2016), former Norwich City footballer